Karlo Čović (born 9 August 1945) is a Serbian wrestler of Vojvodinian Croat descent. He competed for Yugoslavia at the 1968 Summer Olympics and the 1972 Summer Olympics.

References

External links
 

1945 births
Living people
Croats of Vojvodina
Serbian male sport wrestlers
Olympic wrestlers of Yugoslavia
Wrestlers at the 1968 Summer Olympics
Wrestlers at the 1972 Summer Olympics
Sportspeople from Subotica